Raccuja is a comune (municipality) in the Metropolitan City of Messina in the Italian region Sicily, located about  east of Palermo and about  west of Messina.

Raccuja borders the following municipalities: San Piero Patti, Sant'Angelo di Brolo, Floresta, Montalbano Elicona, Sinagra, Ucria.

References

Cities and towns in Sicily